Morningside railway station served the village of Morningside, North Lanarkshire, Scotland from 1844 to 1930 on the Wishaw and Coltness Railway.

History 
The station opened in October 1844 by the Wishaw and Coltness Railway. To the west were two sidings and a turntable. To the southeast was the signal box. Behind the platform was Allanton Brick and Tile Works, which one of the sidings may have been used for. The station closed in 1848 but reopened three years after another station of the same name on 15 May 1867. It closed again on 1 January 1917 but reopened on 2 June 1919, before closing permanently on 1 December 1930.

References

External links 

Disused railway stations in North Lanarkshire
Former Caledonian Railway stations
Railway stations in Great Britain opened in 1844
Railway stations in Great Britain closed in 1848
Railway stations in Great Britain opened in 1867
Railway stations in Great Britain closed in 1917
Railway stations in Great Britain opened in 1919
Railway stations in Great Britain closed in 1930
1844 establishments in Scotland
1930 disestablishments in Scotland